SQRRR or SQ3R is a reading comprehension method named for its five steps: survey, question, read, recite and review. The method was introduced by Francis P. Robinson, an American education philosopher in his 1946 book Effective Study.

The method offers a more efficient and active approach to reading textbook material. It was created for college students, but is useful for young students as well. Classrooms all over the world have begun using this method to better understand what they are reading.

Similar methods developed subsequently include PQRST and KWL table.

Process 
Survey ("S")
The first step, survey, skim, or scan advises that one should resist the temptation to read the book and instead first go through a chapter and note the headings, sub-headings and other outstanding features, such as figures, tables, marginal information, and summary paragraphs. This survey step typically only takes 3–5 minutes, but it provides an outline or framework for what will be presented. The reader should identify ideas and formulate questions about the content of the chapter.
Question ("Q")
Generate questions about the content of the reading. For example, convert headings and sub-headings into questions, and then look for answers in the content of the text. Other more general questions may also be formulated:
 What is this chapter about?
 What question is this chapter trying to answer?
 How does this information help me?
Read (R1)
Use the background work done with "S" and "Q" in order to begin reading actively. This means reading in order to answer the questions raised under "Q". Passive reading, in contrast, results in merely reading without engaging with the study material.
Recite (R2)
The second "R" refers to the part known as "Recite." The reader should try to recite from memory what was learned in the same manner as telling someone else about the information. It is important that the reader use their own words in order to formulate and conceptualize the material. Try recalling and identifying major points (heading/subheadings) and answers to questions from the "Q" step. This recital step may be done either in an oral or written format and is related to the benefits of retrieval (testing effect) in boosting long-term memory for the material.
Review (R3)
The final "R" is "Review." Once you reach the end of the passage, review the material by repeating back to yourself what the point of the passage is using your own words. You may then repeat the process on the second set of questions.

See also 
KWL table
PQRST (study skill)
Pareto principle
Study skills
Speed reading
Spaced repetition
Cornell Notes
Francis P. Robinson

References

External links 
Study Skills Handouts Worcester Polytechnic Institute, Massachusetts
SQ3R – Improving Reading Comprehension Virginia Tech, Blacksburg, Virginia
How to Use the SQ3R Method

Note-taking
Reading (process)